Karshi-Khanabad, better known as K2, is an air base in southeastern Uzbekistan, just east of Karshi. It is home to the 60th Separate Mixed Aviation Brigade of the Uzbek Air Force.

History
From 1954 to 1981, the 735th Fighter Aviation Regiment of the Soviet Air Defence Force was stationed at the base. It was equipped with MiG-15 (July 1950 – 1955), MiG-17 (1955-1969), and then Sukhoi Su-9 (Fishpot) aircraft (1961-1978). The regiment replaced the Su-9 in 1978 with the MiG-23M (Flogger-B).

In 1981 it was renamed the 735th Fighter-Bomber Aviation Regiment, and in 1984 the 735th Bomber Aviation Regiment. Until 1984 the regiment was equipped with the MiG-23M, and from 1984 to 1992 with the Su-24. The regiment was under control of the Soviet Air Forces of the Turkestan Military District from April 1980 to May 1988, and then under 49th Air Army and 73rd Air Army.

On 30 June 1992, control of the base passed from the dissolved Soviet Union to Uzbekistan. From 1992 changes began to affect the regiment before it was merged with other units into the 60th Separate Mixed Aviation Brigade.

Between 2001 and 2005 seven thousand United States Department of Defense personnel were assigned to the base, also known as K2 and "Camp Stronghold Freedom", for support missions against the Taliban and al-Qaeda in neighbouring Afghanistan during Operation Enduring Freedom. The United States Air Force used the base for combat search and rescue missions. The 416th Air Expeditionary Group was the host unit. The base also contained 1,000 10th Mountain Division troops to defend Uzbekistan against incursions by the Islamic Movement of Uzbekistan and other Islamist militant groups based in Afghanistan. On 29 July 2005, amid strained relations caused by the May 2005 unrest in Uzbekistan; a prelude to another Colour Revolution, the United States was told to vacate the base within six months. It was vacated by the United States in November 2005.

Facilities

Pollution 
In November 2001, the US Army Center for Health Promotion and Preventive Medicine-Europe performed an environmental baseline survey and found widespread jet fuel plumes, usually 1–3 meters under ground, most likely from a leaking Soviet-era underground fuel distribution system and smaller, localized areas of surface dirt contaminated with asbestos and low-level radioactive processed uranium, both from the destruction of Soviet missiles several years prior.

United States Armed Forces veterans who served at the base while it was used by the U.S. military described "black goo" oozing out of the soil, appearing to be a mixture of solvents, oils and other chemicals. Noxious vapors were also reported, along with radiation warning signs and a nearby pond that glowed green. Rainwater would reportedly flood tents and appeared contaminated with various chemicals. According to a 2015 Army study, 61 of the K2 veterans had been diagnosed with cancer or died of the disease, not counting the special operations forces.
The United States Department of Veteran's Affairs and U.S. Army Public Health Center had denied that an increased rate of cancers exists or that any contamination at the base posed any serious health problems. The US military took steps to reduce possible sources of contamination, such as filling trenches with soil to create a cap to hold vapors underground, covering radioactive soil and asbestos, which were criticized as ineffective by veterans.

On 18 November 2020, the US House Committee on Oversight and Reform held a hearing on "Karshi-Khanabad: Honoring the Heroes of Camp Stronghold Freedom". A fact sheet was released detailing the health risks at the camp: 
 Petrochemical Contamination and Volatile Organic Compounds (VOCs)
 Particulate Matter 10 (PM10) and Tetrachloroethylene
 Burn Pits
 Radiation exposure
As of the November 2020 hearing, the Department of Veterans' Affairs denied that the illnesses suffered by veterans at K2 suffered were service-connected.

See also 

 Karshi Airport 
 Manas Air Base, Kyrgyzstan
 New Great Game
 Craig Murray
 Islam Karimov

References

External links
 Satellite photo with annotations
 Explanation of annotations

Military installations of Uzbekistan
Airports in Uzbekistan
Qashqadaryo Region
 Military
Soviet Air Force bases
Installations of the United States Air Force
Overseas or abroad military installations